Alpha Bank is the fourth largest Greek bank by total assets. It has a subsidiary and branch in London, England and subsidiaries in Cyprus and Romania. Founded in 1879, it has been controlled by the Costopoulos family since its inception. Most recently, Ioannis Costopoulos, grandson of original founder John F. Costopoulos, and nephew of Stavros Costopoulos, foreign minister in the government of Georgios Papandreou, served in many important capacities before his death March 9, 2021.

History

In Greece

In 1879, John F. Costopoulos established a small commercial firm in the city of Kalamata. The banking department of the "J.F. Costopoulos" firm changed its name to Bank of Kalamata in 1918. The bank moved its headquarters to Athens and changed its name to Banque de Credit Commercial Hellenique in 1924, and on 2 November 1925 the bank was listed on the Athens Exchange.

The bank changed its name to the Commercial Credit Bank (CCB) in 1947, and this name was changed to Credit Bank (Trapeza Pisteos) in 
1972, and to Alpha Credit Bank (ACB) in 1994.

In 1999, ACB acquired 51% of the shares of the Ionian Popular Bank, and absorbed it in 2000. It also changed its name to name to Alpha Bank. An attempted merger between Alpha Bank and the National Bank of Greece fell through in 2002.

In 2012, Alpha Bank called off its merger with Eurobank Ergasias, which had been announced the previous year. The same year, Alpha Bank acquired the Greek department of Emporiki Bank from Credit Agricole for €1. The legal merger was completed on 28 June 2013.  On 31 May 2013 the bank proceeded in a successful recapitalization with an over-subscription of the required private-sector participation in the Rights Issue, which resulted in the preservation of Alpha Bank's private character. Alpha Bank also took over the deposits of Cooperative Bank of Dodecanese, Cooperative Bank of Western Macedonia, and Cooperative Bank of Evia in 2013,
and acquired the entire share capital of Emporiki Bank.

On 31 March 2014 Alpha Bank successfully completed its €1.2 billion capital increase. The Bank redeemed the total amount of the Hellenic Republic's Preference Shares on 17 April 2014.  On 26 October 2014 Alpha Bank announced the successful completion of the European Central Bank's (ECB) Comprehensive Assessment in the Static Adverse Scenario with CET1 8.07% and Capital Surplus of Euro 1.3 billion. Based on the dynamic adverse assumptions, CET1 stands at 8.45% with Capital Surplus of Euro 1.8 billion. Also in 2014, Alpha Bank took over Citibank's Greek retail banking operations.

Alpha Bank requested Emergency Liquidity Assistance (ELA) from the Bank of Greece on 16 January 2015. Its total funding from the ECB (ELA and non-ELA) was €29.9 bn as of 30 September 2015. On 17 July 2015 it sold its Bulgarian branches to Postbank (Bulgaria), the subsidiary of fellow Greek bank Eurobank Ergasias.

Alpha Bank's 2015 end-year result is Risk-Weighted Assets: €52.6bn. Total loans: €62 bn (€52.5 bn in Greek loans, €9.5bn in loans abroad). 51.3% are non-performing exposures using the European Banking Authority definition, with a 50% Provision coverage and €31.4 bn in deposits (€26.3 bn in Greek deposits). Loan to deposit ratio=147%. Cost to income ratio=50%.

In 2019, Alpha Bank was among the Greek organisations raided by authorities as part of an investigation on anti-competitive practices, horizontal agreements or exclusionary practices in the provision of payment services.

International expansion

In 1960, the Commercial Credit Bank established a subsidiary in Cyprus that it may later have closed or sold.

The bank started a program of international expansion, especially in Southeastern Europe, in early 1990. In 1994, Credit Bank and the European Bank for Reconstruction and Development (EBRD) established Banca București in Romania, which commenced operations the following year. Credit Bank owned about 50% of the bank. The ACB also acquired the Commercial Bank of London from the Commercial Bank of Greece (Emporiki Bank) in 1994 and renamed it Alpha Credit Bank London.

In 1998 ACB established a branch in Tirana, Albania, and followed that with three more branches. In the same year, it acquired 82.5% of Lombard NatWest Bank in Cyprus and renamed it Alpha Bank Cyprus Ltd. In 1999 ACB acquired 65% of Kreditna Banka, Skopje, in North Macedonia.(see Alpha Bank Skopje).

Banca București changed its name to Alpha Bank Romania (ABR) in 2000. Banca Monte dei Paschi di Siena took a 5% share in the bank, and Alpha Bank's share became 63%. ABR itself acquired a 12.5% stake in Victoria Bank (est. 1989), the largest private bank in Moldova. In 2002 ACB acquired the minority stake and became the sole shareholder in Alpha Bank Skopje, accounting for 100% of its share capital. Alpha Bank acquired an 88.64% stake in Serbian Jubanka and changed its name to Alpha Bank Beograd, and then to Alpha Bank Srbija in early 2005.

Alpha Bank also has an extensive branch network in Bulgaria, the foundation of which it inherited from Ionian and Popular Bank, which entered in 1994 with a representative office in Sofia.

In August 2007, the Turkish Banking Regulatory and Supervisory Agency blocked Alpha Bank's move to buy a 50% share in Alternatifbank (Abank) citing Alpha Bank as not meeting the terms of Article 8 of Turkey's banking law. The article covers the financial strength, track record and personal history of a bank's board of directors. On 27 March 2008 Alpha Bank reached a deal to buy a majority stake in newly established OJSC Astra Bank in Ukraine, as part of plans to expand in the region. Alpha Bank agreed to buy 90% of Astra Bank for €9 million. Astra Bank became insolvent in March 2015, and in July 2015 it was acquired 100% by Agro Holdings (Ukraine) Limited (a company owned by the US-based NCH Capital).

Alpha Bank has a branch in London and a finance company, and ran Alpha Finance US, in New York, which no longer exists.

Other

Listing on the Athens Exchange
The company is listed on the Athens Exchange with the stock symbol ALPHA; the ISIN is GRS015013006. As of 11 August 2015, the number of securities outstanding and the number of securities listed is 12769059858 (around 12.7 billion).

The stock is one of the 25 stocks in the FTSE/Athex Large Cap index (11 August 2015).

See also

 List of banks
 List of banks in Greece
 Banking in Greece
 List of Greek companies
 Ionian Bank and Ionian Popular Bank of Greece

References

External links

Alpha Bank stock quote on Bloomberg

Banks of Greece
Banks of Albania
Companies listed on the Athens Exchange
Greek brands
Banks established in 1879
Banks under direct supervision of the European Central Bank